Sima Water Town is a tourist attraction located in a village and town in Pingchang County, Bazhong, Sichuan, China.

Attractions
The representative attractions include: 
Clean Energy Industrial Park
Filial Piety Cultural Park
Modern Agriculture Demonstration Park, 
Sima National Wetland Park

References

Pingchang County